The Inter-American Convention on The Forced Disappearance of Persons is a treaty of the Organization of American States (OAS) intended to combat the forced disappearance of persons. The Convention was adopted in 1994. Violations of the convention can be brought to the Inter-American Commission on Human Rights.

, the only state to have signed the convention but not ratified it is Nicaragua.

References

External links
Full Text of the Treaty at the website of the OAS
Current List of State Parties to the treaty

Enforced disappearance
Human rights in Latin America
Human rights instruments
Organization of American States treaties
Treaties concluded in 1994
Treaties entered into force in 1996
Treaties of Argentina
Treaties of Bolivia
Treaties of Brazil
Treaties of Chile
Treaties of Colombia
Treaties of Costa Rica
Treaties of Ecuador
Treaties of Guatemala
Treaties of Honduras
Treaties of Mexico
Treaties of Panama
Treaties of Paraguay
Treaties of Peru
Treaties of Uruguay
Treaties of Venezuela
1994 in Brazil